The phrase Stasi 2.0 is the catchphrase of a civil rights campaign in Germany.

The term originated in the blogosphere, combining the name of East Germany's former Ministry of State Security, commonly known as the "Stasi", with the concept of software versioning as used in the popular phrase "Web 2.0". The implication is that Stasi 2.0 is the modernized, updated and contemporary successor (or "version" in the software usage) of Stasi. The campaign focuses on the proposals of Wolfgang Schäuble, at that time Secretary of the Interior of Germany. Schäuble then proposed a preemptive security strategy, which critics contend bears similarities to the practices of the Stasi, but using current technology. His most disputed ideas involve his proposals for telecommunications data retention, his proposal to legalize military action of the Bundeswehr inside German borders, and his support for covert "online searches" of suspects' computer equipment. His latest proposal in particular has met stiff opposition from many prominent German netizens, as well as the Chaos Computer Club.

Though Schäuble claims his proposals serve to protect a "Right to Security", no such right is recognized under the German constitution.

The phrase Stasi 2.0 has been used by protestors criticising Barack Obama by likening him to a Stasi figure in The Lives of Others during the 2013 mass surveillance disclosures about the involvement of the National Security Agency in monitoring German communications, including those of chancellor Angela Merkel.

Criticism

One Leipzig-based shirt printing service refused at first to print the trademark image of the campaign, claiming the campaign to be libelous, but later did print it.

In August 2013, German Chancellor Angela Merkel told the newspaper Die Zeit that she rejected the comparison between the American National Security Agency and the Stasi, suggesting that the comparison trivialises what state security did to people in East Germany. When it was made public that the NSA had been tapping her own personal mobile phone, Merkel reversed her position, stating to President Obama, "This is like the Stasi."

References

External links

Interview with Markus Beckedahl (blogger and supporter of Stasi 2.0; German)
German Authorities Investigate Surveillance Leaks - Electronic Frontier Foundation, 22 July 2015
German spy leaks website being investigated - BBC News, 30 July 2015

Protests in Germany
Protests in the European Union
Graffiti and unauthorised signage
Counterinsurgency
Surveillance
Internet culture
Web 2.0